Prosper Antoine Marie Joseph, Viscount Poullet (5 March 1868 – 3 December 1937) was a Belgian politician.

Born in Leuven, Poullet studied law at the Catholic University of Leuven and was later a professor at the university.  He was of member of K.A.V. Lovania Leuven, a Catholic student fraternity associated with the Union of Catholic German Student Fraternities.

A successful politician, Poullet was a member of the Catholic Party and sat in the Belgian Chamber of Representatives. He frequently held ministerial office between 1911 and 1934, holding the Arts and Science portfolio from 1911 to 1918, Railways and Posts from 1919 to 1920, Interior minister in 1924–1925 and 1932–1934, Economic affairs in 1925, Justice in 1925–1926 and War in 1926. He served as the prime minister of Belgium in 1925–1926 and was named an honorary minister of State on leaving office.

Private life 
He was married to Maria de Monge, viscountess de Franeau (Louvain 1871–1953).

Honours 
:  Grand Cross in the Order of the Crown, by RD of 15.11.1921.
: Grand Officer in the Order of Leopold, by RD of 13.11.1919.
:  Grand Cross in the Order of Orange-Nassau
: Commander in the Order of Saint Olav
: Order of the Dannebrog
: Order of the Crown, Romania
Honorary Professor, University of Leuven

References

External links 
 
 Prosper Poullet in ODIS - Online Database for Intermediary Structures 
 Archives of Prosper Poullet in ODIS - Online Database for Intermediary Structures
 Collection of Prosper Poullet in KU Leuven Libraries

|-

1868 births
1937 deaths
Belgian Ministers of State
Politicians of Catholic political parties
Presidents of the Chamber of Representatives (Belgium)
Prime Ministers of Belgium
Viscounts of Belgium
Viscounts Poullet
Belgian Ministers of Defence
Belgian Ministers of Justice
Academic staff of KU Leuven